Cyclostremella orbis is a species of sea snail, a marine gastropod mollusk in the family Pyramidellidae, the pyrams and their allies. The species is one of three known species to exist within the genus Cyclostremella. The other species being Cyclostremella concordia and Cyclostremella humilis.

References

External links
 To World Register of Marine Species

Pyramidellidae
Gastropods described in 1857